Clinicbook is an online healthcare directory and medical appointment booking service. Users can search and review doctors, dentists, massage therapists, and other healthcare providers. Healthcare clinics can create and edit their own pages on Clinicbook.ca and post information such as operating hours, practitioners' pictures and service areas for patients.

History
Clinicbook was founded in 2009 by the University of British Columbia alumni Robin McFee, Winnie Lai and Joel Matsumoto. The company is based in Vancouver, BC and provides clinic information across Canada. As of December 23, 2010, there are 60,000 medical clinics listed on Clinicbook.com.

Business model
Clinicbook aims to help connect patients looking for healthcare practitioners with practitioners looking for new patients. The service is free for patients while clinics pay a monthly service fee for the booking functionality.

Recognition
Clinical Media Ltd., producer of Clinicbook was among the winners of Generator Challenge in Vancouver, a competition presented by the City of Vancouver and Discovery Parks with the goal of supporting some of the city's most promising early-stage tech companies.

References

External links
 Clinicbook’s website 

Canadian medical websites